Diary of a Mod Housewife is the debut album by the American musician Amy Rigby, released in 1996. It has been called a concept album about growing older in a music scene, marriage, motherhood, and romantic dissolution.

Production
The album was produced by the Cars guitarist Elliot Easton, with the dB member Gene Holder. Rigby duets with John Wesley Harding on the album's third track, "Beer & Kisses". Ira Kaplan contributed organ to "That Tone of Voice". Diary of a Mod Housewife was written while Rigby was doing temp work in New York.

Critical reception

Robert Christgau thought that Rigby personalizes "the political for a bohemia that coexists oh so neatly with structural underemployment [and thinks] harder about marriage than a dozen Nashville homilizers." Entertainment Weekly called the album "an impressive debut," writing that the songs "occupy a world where relationships, jobs, and urban life are rife with unfulfilled promise." The New York Times thought that "like Kate McGarrigle and Iris DeMent, Ms. Rigby has a reedy voice with steely underpinnings," writing: "With clear-cut melodies and an exacting eye, songs like 'Beer and Kisses' and 'Just Someone I Had in Mind' measure the distance between romance and reality." 

The Philadelphia Inquirer placed the album on the "short" list of "grown-up rock-and-roll records that examine monogamy with insight and intelligence." Stereo Review deemed it "a cross between the Go-Go's, Buddy Holly, and a female cowpunk band."

AllMusic wrote that "in addition to her knowing lyrical eye, Rigby is also a terrific composer who synthesizes elements of rock, country, folk and girl group-era pop."

Track listing

References

1996 albums